John Coode  may refer to:
John Coode (engineer) (1816–1892)
John Coode (Governor of Maryland) (c. 1648–1709)